The canton of Villedieu-les-Poêles-Rouffigny (before March 2020: canton of Villedieu-les-Poêles) is an administrative division of the Manche department, northwestern France. Its borders were modified at the French canton reorganisation which came into effect in March 2015. Its seat is in Villedieu-les-Poêles-Rouffigny.

It consists of the following communes:

Beslon
La Bloutière
Boisyvon
Bourguenolles
Champrepus
La Chapelle-Cécelin
Chérencé-le-Héron
La Colombe
Coulouvray-Boisbenâtre
Fleury
Le Guislain
La Haye-Bellefond
La Lande-d'Airou
Margueray
Maupertuis
Montabot
Montbray
Morigny
Percy-en-Normandie
Sainte-Cécile
Saint-Martin-le-Bouillant
Saint-Maur-des-Bois
Saint-Pois
Le Tanu
La Trinité
Villebaudon
Villedieu-les-Poêles-Rouffigny

References

Cantons of Manche